Prentiss Hubb (born March 19, 1999) is an American basketball player for the Riesen Ludwigsburg of the Basketball Bundesliga.

High school career
Hubb attended Gonzaga College High School in Washington, D.C., where he was teammates with Chris Lykes. As a junior, he averaged 13.8 points and 4.5 assists per game. Hubb earned First Team All-Washington Catholic Athletic Conference (WCAC) honors and won the WCAC title for his second straight year. He missed his senior season with a torn anterior cruciate ligament in his right knee. Hubb competed for DC Premier on the Amateur Athletic Union circuit. A consensus four-star recruit, he committed to playing college basketball for Notre Dame over offers from Maryland, Villanova and Virginia.

College career
As a freshman at Notre Dame, Hubb averaged 8.1 points and four assists per game. In his sophomore season, he averaged 12.1 points and 5.1 assists per game. On February 27, 2021, Hubb recorded a career-high 28 points, seven assists and five rebounds in a 94–90 loss to Boston College. He averaged 14.6 points and 5.9 assists per game as a junior, and was named to the Third Team All-Atlantic Coast Conference (ACC).

Career statistics

College

|-
| style="text-align:left;"| 2018–19
| style="text-align:left;"| Notre Dame
| 33 || 29 || 33.6 || .324 || .262 || .673 || 3.1 || 4.0 || 1.0 || .4 || 8.1
|-
| style="text-align:left;"| 2019–20
| style="text-align:left;"| Notre Dame
| 32 || 32 || 35.3 || .385 || .344 || .712 || 2.4 || 5.1 || 1.0 || .1 || 12.1
|-
| style="text-align:left;"| 2020–21
| style="text-align:left;"| Notre Dame
| 26 || 25 || 36.9 || .392 || .342 || .780 || 3.2 || 5.8 || .7 || .3 || 14.6
|-
| style="text-align:left;"| 2021–22
| style="text-align:left;"| Notre Dame
| 35 || 32 || 33.7 || .366 || .313 || .733 || 3.2 || 4.0 || .7 || .2 || 8.9
|- class="sortbottom"
| style="text-align:center;" colspan="2"| Career
| 126 || 118 || 34.7 || .369 || .318 || .726 || 3.0 || 4.6 || .9 || .2 || 10.7

References

External links
Notre Dame Fighting Irish bio

1999 births
Living people
American men's basketball players
Basketball players from Washington, D.C.
Gonzaga College High School alumni
Notre Dame Fighting Irish men's basketball players
Point guards
Riesen Ludwigsburg players